Brave Combo is a polka/rock/worldbeat band based in Denton, Texas.  Founded in 1979 by guitarist/keyboardist/accordionist Carl Finch, they have been a prominent fixture in the Texas music scene for more than thirty-five years. Their music, both originals and covers, incorporates a number of dance styles, mostly polka, but also some Latin American and Caribbean styles like norteño, salsa, rumba, cha-cha-cha, choro, samba, two-step, cumbia, charanga, merengue, ska, etc.

As part of their perceived artistic mission to expand the musical tastes of their listeners, they have often played and recorded covers of well-known songs in a style radically different from the original versions.  Examples include polka versions of Jimi Hendrix's "Purple Haze" and The Doors' "People are Strange", The Rolling Stones' "(I Can't Get No) Satisfaction" as a cha-cha, and "Sixteen Tons" as a cumbia.  While their records may have a sense of humor, they are played straight and not usually considered joke or novelty records.

History and influences
In a 1995 feature in The Santa Fe New Mexican, band cofounder Carl Finch described Brave Combo's influence as a polka band with rock styles as an earnest way to escape an increasingly corporate cultural landscape, lamenting-

'Rock had been removed from the common people' he said 'and musically I wanted what I do to have depth, I started listening to polka and ethnic records I'd find at Target six for $5 — nothing could beat that. At first, I’d just buy whatever covers looked strangest but after a while I’d do research and find out what was good.' Among the best, he soon discovered, were names like Larry Chesky and his big band polka sound, Norwegian accordion virtuoso Andrew Walter (“exciting intense” is Finch’s assessment), and Eddie Blazonczyk, the “Godfather” of Chicago’s Polish community. 'All this came out of a sense of desperation'.

Awards and honors
They won a Grammy Award in 1999 in the Best Polka Album category for their album Polkasonic, and again in 2004 for their album Let's Kiss.

In naming Denton, Texas, the "Best Music Scene" for 2008, Paste magazine cited Brave Combo as the "Grand Pooh-Bah of Denton bands" and said that "Brave Combo, is in many ways the template from which all the rest are cut: eclectic and artistically ambitious, with a high degree of musicianship and a strong DIY ethic."

Media appearances
 
The band made a short appearance, as animated figures, on the March 21, 2004, episode of The Simpsons ("Co-Dependents' Day"). Series creator Matt Groening is a fan of the band and they appeared on the show at his personal request.  In the episode, the band played a new original song called "Fill The Stein" and their version of "The Simpsons Theme" played over the closing credits.
Finch and other band members made cameo appearances in Talking Heads leader David Byrne's 1986 movie True Stories, set in  fictional Virgil, Texas.  Finch can be spotted in the fashion show sporting a brick-patterned suit and in the parade leading the all-accordion marching band. (In real life, Brave Combo was David Byrne's wedding band.)
They appear in the 1986 Hank Wangford Channel 4 television series The A to Z of C & W singing the Hank Williams song "Cold, Cold Heart".
They contributed two songs to the Gumby album, released in 1989.
Their song "Busy Office Rhumba" was used as the theme for the 1993 Fox television series Bakersfield P.D.
They appear as a wedding band in the 1995 feature film Late Bloomers.
In 2000, they appeared on the national telecast of the MDA Labor Day Telethon with Jerry Lewis dancing along to the music.
They wrote and performed the theme song for the 2005 series "ESPN Bowling Night".
The opening theme and other music for the 2008 PBS animated series Click and Clack's As the Wrench Turns were produced by Carl Finch and composed, arranged, and performed by Finch and Brave Combo.
Their live music video, "The Denton Polka", appears on the Bohemia Rising DVD Compilation (released in 2009), a collection of documentary shorts directed by Christopher Largen exploring rebellion and resistance to corporate demolition in their hometown of Denton, Texas.
Included in Bob Dylan's 2009 Christmas release, Christmas In The Heart, the song "Must Be Santa", is performed polka-style. Dylan's arrangement is almost identical to the Brave Combo arrangement from their 1991 CD It's Christmas, Man!. In an interview published by Street News Service, Dylan acknowledged the influence of Brave Combo: "This version comes from a band called Brave Combo. Somebody sent their record to us for our radio show. They’re a regional band out of Texas that takes regular songs and changes the way you think about them. You oughta hear their version of 'Hey Jude'."
They were featured on Bowling for Soup's album Sorry for Partyin', playing a polka version of Bowling For Soup's song "Belgium". 
The season seven episode "Fun on a Bun" of the animated science fiction comedy Futurama includes two original songs by the band plus a cover version of "The Chicken Dance". The episode debuted August 1, 2012, on Comedy Central.

Discography

US studio and live albums

International releases

Members

Carl Finch – guitar, keyboards, accordion (born November 29, 1951, Texarkana, Arkansas) (1979–present)
Lyle Atkinson – bass guitar, tuba (born October 23, 1953, Minneapolis, Minnesota) (1979–1985, 2015–present)
Danny O'Brien – trumpet (born July 12, 1966, Lakenheath, England) (1993–present)
Alan Emert – drums (born May 5, 1965) (1997–2008, 2010–present)
Robert Hokamp – guitar, lap steel, cornet (2015–present) *

Former members
Jeffrey Barnes – saxophones, clarinet, flute, harmonica, penny whistles (born July 27, 1951, Fremont, Ohio) (1983–2015)
Ginny Mac – accordion (2011–2013)

Tim Walsh – saxophone, flute, clarinet (born c.1952) (1979–1983)
Dave Cameron – drums (born c.1958) (1979–1983)
Cenobio "Bubba" Hernandez – bass guitar (born November 30, 1958, San Antonio, Texas) (1985–2007)
Phil Hernandez – drums (born February 5, 1971, Buffalo, New York) (1992 – ?)
Mitch Marine – drums (born c.1956) (1983–1992)
Joe Cripps – percussion (born January 5, 1965, Little Rock, Arkansas - missing, last seen October 19, 2016, Little Rock, Arkansas) (1992–1999), some subsequent performances
Greg Beck – drums (1996–1997)
Paul Stivitts – drums (born 1971) NYC
Ann Marie Harrop – bass guitar (2007–2009)
Little Jack Melody – bass guitar (2009–2014)
Arjuna Contreras – drums (born August 11, 1974, Kenosha, Wisconsin) (2008–2010)
Bill Tomlin – drums (born September 28, 1948)

References

External links

Bohemia Rising: The Story of Fry Street

Brave Combo collection at the Internet Archive's live music archive

Musical groups established in 1979
Grammy Award winners
American polka groups
Worldbeat groups
Musical groups from Denton, Texas